The 1998 World Weightlifting Championships were held in Lahti, Finland from November 7 to November 15. The women's competition in the light-heavyweight (69 kg division) was staged on 13 November 1998.

Medalists

Records

Results

New records

References

Results
Weightlifting World Championships Seniors Statistics, Page 13 

1998 World Weightlifting Championships
World